Setup is an album by Stanley Cowell with a sextet recorded in 1993 and first released on the historically important Danish SteepleChase label in 1994.

Reception

AllMusic said the album was "especially noteworthy, for Cowell is a gifted, if underrated, composer. Cowell's talents as a composer are illustrated by memorable post-bop or hard bop pieces".

Track listing
All compositions by Stanley Cowell
 "Departure" - 11:03		
 "Setup" - 7:11		
 "Varions" - 6:29		
 "Bright Passion" - 7:12		
 "Bip Bip Bam" - 9:18		
 "Sendai Sendoff" - 10:03		
 "Carnegie Six" - 8:30

Personnel
Stanley Cowell - piano
Eddie Henderson - trumpet
Dick Griffin - trombone
Rick Margitza - tenor saxophone
Peter Washington - bass
Billy Hart - drums

References

1994 albums
Stanley Cowell albums
SteepleChase Records albums